Indosinia is a genus of flowering plants belonging to the family Ochnaceae.

Its native range is Indo-China.

Species:
 Indosinia involucrata (Gagnep.) J.E.Vidal

References

Ochnaceae
Malpighiales genera